The rebellion of Jeong Yeo-rip in 1589, known in Korean as the Gichuk oksa (기축옥사, 己丑獄事), was one of the bloodiest political purges in Korea's Joseon Dynasty.  Its scale was greater than all four of the notorious literati purges combined.  At that time Joseon politics was dominated by conflict between Eastern and Western factions.  Neo-Confucian scholar and Easterner Jeong Yeo-rip was accused of high treason, after which as many as 1,000 Easterners were killed or exiled.  (Oksa means a major case involving high treason in Korean, and there were several events named oksa during the Joseon period.)

There is still much dispute about the Treason Case of 1589 because there is a wealth of conflicting historical accounts written by both factions.  In the Annals of Joseon Dynasty, the official royal record of the Joseon Dynasty, the Seonjo Annals were written by the Easterners (who held power in Gwanghaegun's reign during which it was written) while the Revised Seonjo Annals were written by the Westerners who later seized power with a coup d'état that placed Injo on throne.  In "Yeonryeoshil Records", unofficial history compiled by Yi Geung-don much later, Yi included accounts of the both sides and marked them in different colors to identify them as such.

Sarim's division
During King Seonjo's reign, the Sarim scholars following the Kim Jong-jik's school of Neo-Confucianism seized power after long period of persecution and purges.  However, generational difference soon emerged within the Sarim faction - older generation who entered politics during predecessor Myeongjong's reign and younger generation who became officials during Seonjo's time.  Their difference was reflected in their attitude toward Shim Eui-gyeom, Myeongjong's brother-in-law.  The Sarim tended to regard the king's maternal relatives as corrupting influence on the court and best to be excluded from politics.  But  older generation, which came to be called the Westerners because Shim's house was on the west of the palace, supported Shim for being Yi Hwang's disciple and protecting them from yet another purge of Sarim that had been planned by his uncle. However, younger generation, called Esterners because its leader Kim Hyo-won's house was on the east of the palace, regarded Shim and older Sarim officials partly responsible for excesses of Myeongjong's reign, which was notorious for corruption and abuse of Yoon Won-hyeong, Myeong's maternal uncle. Philosophically, Easterners tended to be followers of Yi Hwang and Jo Shik while the Westerners followed Yi I and Seong Hun.

This division was soon brought to conflict, however, mainly because of personal grudge between Shim and Kim.  When a key position in Ministry of Personnel became vacant and Kim was recommended by the predecessor, Shim opposed Kim's appointment claiming that Kim was Yoon Wong-hyeong's hanger-on.  There could be no greater insult to a Sarim scholar.  Kim, who was nevertheless appointed to the position, later opposed Shim's younger brother being appointed to the same position as his successor.  
Yi I attempted to prevent the factional split by appointing Shim Eui-gyeom and Kim Hyo-won to provincial posts away from the court and tried to arrange truce between Easterner Yi Bal and Westerner Jeong Cheol. After Yi I's death, however, the conflict between two factions became more intense as the Easterners impeached Shim Eui-gyeom, leading to his dismissal, and gained upper hand.

Jeong Yeo-rip's "revolt"
As the Easterners began to take key positions, Jeong Yeo-rip changed his affiliation from the Western to Eastern faction and criticized his teacher Yi I after his death, earning hatred and contempt of the Westerners as well as Seonjo, who greatly respected Yi I.  Jeong left the court and went back to his hometown where he formed a private society with his supporters.  Called Great Common Society (대동계), anyone could join the society regardless of one's social status or gender, and they met each month to socialize together as well as study and also undergo military training.  It was not a secret society as it helped defeat the Japanese marauders at the local government's request in one occasion.  The society spread throughout Honam region (today's Jeolla) and even beyond.  One day a government official in Hwanghae province reported to King Seonjo that there was conspiracy for rebellion in his areas and that their leader was Jeong Yeo-rip.

There is still a great deal of dispute whether Jeong was conspiring to rebel or whether it was a  frame up concocted by the Westerners.  There is also a dispute about the nature and purpose of Great Common Society.  Jeong supposedly said, "the world is something to be shared and therefore there cannot be one master."  He argued that the world belonged to the people, and whoever chosen by them was the king.  Jeong's philosophy reflected a desire for classless society, opposition to hereditary monarchy, and possibly even republicanism.  Such revolutionary ideas and presence of armed supporters could not help but attract attention of his enemies.  For a long time in Korean history, Jeong Yeo-rip's rebellion has been accepted as a fact even by the Easterners, but some historians note that there was no evidence except confessions from tortured followers and letters and writings discovered in his house, which could have been forged.

What is undisputed is that Jeong Yeo-rip's supposed rebellion led to a widespread purge of countless Easterners who had nothing to do with Jeong and died terrible deaths as a result.   Jeong Cheol, head of the Western faction and a famous poet whose poems are still studied in Korean schools, was in charge of investigating the case and used the case to purge Easterners who had slightest connection with Jeong Yeo-rip.  It was said that even a man who shed tears because dust entered his eyes (when Jeong Yeo-rip's body was mutilated after his suicide) was killed for suspected sympathy for Jeong Yeo-rip.

Song Yik-pil and Ahn Family
According to some accounts, the origin of Treason Case of 1589 goes back to the Third Literati Purge of 1519 during Jungjong's reign and the resulting grudge between two families.  After Sarim's head Jo Gwang-jo was executed on framed charges in 1519, Right State Councillor Ahn Dang was dismissed for supporting Jo and his followers, among whom were his sons.  In 1521, Song Saryeon, Ahn's family slave who rose to become a government official of senior fifth rank under Ahn Dang's patronage, reported to King Jungjong that Ahn Dang's son was conspiring to kill Chief State Councillor Nam Gon and Shim Jeong, instigators of the Third Literati Purge of 1519.  He presented a guest list for funeral of Ahn's wife as the evidence of conspirators’ meeting. At least a dozen Sarim scholars including Ahn Dang and his family were killed in this event, called False Treason Case of 1521 (Shinsa muok·신사무옥), and Song Saryeon was rewarded with promotion to high rank and Ahn family's entire possession.

One of his sons was Song Yik-pil, who became a scholar of such renown that he formed friendship with Yi I and leading Westerners who praised that his achievement was enough to cover his father's crimes. It is remarkable indeed that Song Yik-pil overcame the fact that his father not only betrayed his master and benefactor, which would be considered one of the worst sins in Confucian world, but caused one of purges against the Sarim scholars, especially Jo Gwang-jo's supporters.  By Seonjo's reign, the Sarim faction took control of the government and Jo Gwang-jo and Ahn family were fully rehabilitated as their martyrs.

However, some hardline Easterners saw Song Yik-pil as the mastermind behind the Westerners and instigated the descendants of Ahn Dang to seek justice and punishment for Song Saryeon, who was then deceased after enjoying thirty years of power and wealth. Facing certain revenge from aggrieved Ahn family, the Song family scattered and became fugitives. Song Yik-pil, who turned from a respected scholar to fugitive slave overnight, hid himself by secretly staying with leaders of the Westerners such as Jeong Cheol, his disciple and famous scholar Kim Jang-saeng, and even an Easterner like Yi San-hae. According to some accounts, it was while Song Yik-pil was in Hwanghae area that the accusation of treason was made against Jeong Yeo-rip, who lived in Honam. During the whole period when Jeong Cheol was in charge of investigating the treason case and interrogated the Easterners, Song Yik-pil was said to be staying with Jeong Cheol.

Purge of Easterners
When the accusation against Jeong Yeo-rip was first made, the Easterners held key positions and were in charge of investigating the case.  The Easterners told Seonjo that Jeong Yeo-rip could not possibly be plotting a rebellion when Jeong unexpectedly committed suicide, which was considered the admission of guilt.  The Westerners accused the Easterners of being half-hearted in pursuing the case, and Seonjo promoted hardline Westerner Jeong Cheol as Right State Councillor and put him in charge of investigation despite Jeong Cheol's initial refusal.  Soon afterward, Jeong Yeo-rip's nephew began to mention names of the Easterners including Left State Councillor Jeong Eon Shin, hardliner Yi Bal, and many others (It was customary to use to torture when interrogating prisoners).  Their denial of being close to Jeong Yeo-rip angered Seonjo since many of their letters were found in Jeong's house, some of which were critical of the king and his rule. (It was said that Jeong Eon Shin was told by his men that his letters with Jeong were destroyed, but they only destroyed ones that directly mentioned his name and not nicknames.  When Jeong Eon Shin denied exchanging letters with Jeong Yeo-rip, Seonjo angrily asked, "Does he think I have no eyes?" pointing to 19 letters in which they discussed state affairs.)  Jeong Cheol asked for leniency with Jeong Eun Shin, Yi Bal, and others claiming that they could not know Jeong Yeo-rip's evil side, but the Easterners claim that Jeong Cheol sought to destroy them while appearing to try to save them on the outside.  Indeed, Yi Bal and his brother, Choe Young-gyeong (greatly respected scholar of Yeongnam School), and many others died in prison of torture or illness. (Jeong Cheol's animosity with Yi Bal was such that he even spat on him in one occasion.) Even Yi Bal's 80-year-old mother and 8-year-old son were killed (although Jeong Cheol supposedly opposed it).  The treason case went on for three years, and 1,000 people were killed or exiled. (According to some accounts, the death toll was 1,000.)

However, it was Seonjo who probably played a greater role than anyone else in turning Jeong Yeo-rip's treason case to widespread purge that it became.  Sarim's division strengthened the king's power, and the purge was focused on hardline Easterners (Jeong Yeo-rip, Yi Bal) as opposed to moderate Easterners (Yi San-hae, Yu Seong-ryong) who came out unscathed.  Hardline Easterners were the most radical of the Sarim factions.  In contrast, Yi San-hae and Yu Seong-ryong were protected by Seonjo when their names came up in the treason case.  Later Seonjo would blame Jeong Cheol for excesses of Treason Case of 1589.

Aftermath
The Treason Case of 1589 is significant as the moment when the conflict within Sarim faction was irrevocably marred with bad blood, becoming struggle of life and death that characterized much periods of Joseon politics.  The Eastern faction was further split between hardline Northerners and moderate Southerners over the question of punishing Jeong Cheol and other Westerners.  The Northern faction came on top and continued the cycle of revenge for earlier wrongs.  The Treason Case of 1589 is also blamed for Joseon's unpreparedness and poor showing in the Japanese Invasion of 1592 three years later.  Some historians blame Treason Case of 1589 for the subsequent discrimination against Honam region as land of rebellion, whose effect is still felt today.  It is also remembered today for Jeong Yeo-rip's revolutionary ideas ahead of its time.

References

Political repression
Treason
Political and cultural purges
Joseon dynasty
16th century in Korea
1589 in Asia